See also :Category:People of the California Gold Rush

This is a list of people associated with the California Gold Rush in Northern California during the period from 1848 to 1855.

Charles H. Bennett, present at the first discovery of gold
Samuel Brannan
R. C. Chambers
Jean Baptiste Charbonneau
William D. Bradshaw
Charles Crocker
Alonzo Delano
Charles S. Fairfax
Thomas Fallon
Joseph Libbey Folsom
John C. Frémont
John White Geary
Domingo Ghirardelli
Daniel Govan
Ulysses Grant
Alvinza Hayward
Albert W. Hicks
John Wesley Hillman
Sherman Otis Houghton
William B. Ide
Frank James
Seth Kinman
James Lick
Heinrich Lienhard
James Marshall, discoverer of the first gold
Richard Barnes Mason
John Templeton McCarty
James McClatchy
Benjamin McCulloch
Joaquin Miller
Joaquin Murietta
Isaac Murphy
Joshua Norton, a.k.a. His Imperial Majesty Norton I, Emperor of the United States and Protector of Mexico
Lester Allan Pelton, inventor of the "Pelton Runner," considered to be the "Father of Hydroelectric Power"
Addison Pratt
Benjamin B. Redding
John Howell Sears, arrived by boat in 1850 to San Francisco.
William Tecumseh Sherman
Claus Spreckels
Leland Stanford
Elijah Steele
Levi Strauss
John Sutter
A. A. Townsend
George Treat
Matthew Turner
Mark Twain
Maríano Guadalupe Vallejo
William Waldo
Bela Wellman
Luzena Wilson
Edwin B. Winans

References

Gold Rush
California Gold Rush
Gold